The Welega (also spelled Wallagga or Wal-arga) is a branch of the Oromo people who live in Oromia Region of Ethiopia, in the former Welega Province; a few live across the border in Sudan. They speak the Oromo language.

The Wellega population is approximately 8 million, many of them being Christians.

Wallaga is one of the fertile lands of Western Oromia and it is known for its coffee, honey, dairy products, gold, platinum and other natural resources among others.

See also
Mecha and Tulama Self-Help Association

References 

Oromo groups
Ethnic groups in Sudan

wallaga is the place were modern education has been started in 1886 at Boji Dermeji through Onsmos Nesib in Ethiopia, but it was not written in Ethiopian history also the modern Oil(Zayit) factory has been established in Dambi dollo in 1945 by American Missionary. this also unwritten wallagan History (source shimelis Tamene Gobena PhD candidate @AASTU)